Thornwell may refer to:

 Thornwell, Louisiana, an unincorporated community in Jefferson Davis Parish
 Thornwell Orphanage, in Clinton, South Carolina
 James Henley Thornwell (1812–1862), American Presbyterian preacher and religious writer
 Sindarius Thornwell (born 1994), American College basketball player
 Thornwell Jacobs (1877–1956), educator, author, and Presbyterian minister

See also
 Thornwell–Presbyterian College Historic District, located in Clinton, Laurens County, South Carolina
 Thornwell-Elliott House, historic home located at Fort Mill, York County, South Carolina
 George Thornewell (1898–1986), English international footballer
 Thörnell, a surname